The Katholischer Studentenverein Arminia (Catholic Students Society Arminia) is one of Germany's oldest Catholic male student societies.

History 
Arminia is a student association founded on 6 November 1863 at the University of Bonn. The name was chosen in reference to Arminius, the chief of the Cherusci who drove the Romans out of Germany and thus became a symbol of the – not yet unified – fatherland in the 19th century. In 1865 Arminia, among four other Catholic corporations, became the founder of the Kartellverband katholischer deutscher Studentenvereine (KV), Germany's second oldest umbrella organisation of Catholic male student societies.

In accordance with the Roman Catholic faith and teachings, Arminia strictly refuses academic fencing. Its members do not wear couleur. Arminia's motto is Treu, frei! (English: Loyal, straightforward!). Arminia's principles are (Latin) religio, scientia and amicitia.

Because of its history and its large number of prominent members, Arminia is one of the most distinguished student corporations. Like all German student corporations Arminia is much smaller than American fraternities usually are; it has approx. 350 members, including "Aktive" (students) and "Alte Herren" (alumni).

Famous members

German Chancellors 
 Konrad Adenauer (1876–1967), first postwar German chancellor, German Minister of Foreign Affaires, Father of the House (Bundestag), President of the Parliamentary Council, President of the Prussian Council of State
 Georg Count Hertling (1843–1919), Chancellor of the German Empire, Minister President of Prussia, Foreign Minister of Prussia, Minister-President of Bavaria
 Wilhelm Marx (1863–1946), Chancellor of the German Empire, Minister President of Prussia, Minister of Justice of the German Empire

Others 
 Michael F. Feldkamp (born 1962) German historian and journalist on the staff of the German Bundestag 
 Adolf Fritzen (1838–1919), Archbishop of Strasbourg
 Karl Trimborn (1854–1921), Secretary of State of the Ministry of the Interior of the German Empire
 Hans Müller (1884–1961), President of the Federal Fiscal Court
 Joseph Schneider (1900–1986), first President of the Federal Social Court
 Ludwig Pastor Baron Camperfelden (1854–1928), one of the most important Catholic historians, ambassador of the Republic of Austria to the Holy See
 Rainer Ludwig Claisen (1851–1930), famous German chemist
 August Everding (1928–1999), outstanding German opera director and administrator of the 20th century whose productions were performed in all major international houses
 Karl Albrecht, director of Aldi, son of Karl Albrecht (born 1920), the wealthiest man in Germany
 Heinrich Weitz (1890–1962), President of the German Red Cross

A number of members participated in the Widerstand (English: resistance) against Nazi Germany; two of them, Leo Trouet and Benedikt Schmittmann, were arrested and killed.

Quotation 
"Last week Adenauer's college days became a topic of national discussion. Addressing a nostalgic reunion of Alte Herren (old grads) (note: at Arminia's hundredth anniversary celebration), the Chancellor defended Germany's tradition of fraternities, which are widely accused of fostering authoritarianism. Though at 87 Adenauer has seen most if not all of his old fraternity classmates die, he is still a loyal member of Arminia. […] Adenauer is supposed to confine himself to being […] the oldest surviving member of Arminia." (Germany. The Oldest Grad, in: Time Magazine (Atlantic Edition) 82 (1963) No. 4, July 26, 1963, 26–27.)

External links
K.St.V. Arminia – Official website
Arminia's postcards since 1896

Kartellverband
Catholic Church in Germany
Student religious organisations in Germany
Organisations based in Bonn
University of Bonn
1863 establishments in Prussia
Student organizations established in 1863
Youth organisations based in Germany